Petrov is a municipality and village in Hodonín District in the South Moravian Region of the Czech Republic. It has about 1,300 inhabitants.

Geography
The Radějovka stream and the Baťa Canal flow through the municipality. It lies in a flat landscape of the Lower Morava Valley. The Kyjovka River flows west of the town and supplies several fish ponds.

History
The first written mention of Petrov is from 1412, however it was founded probably between 1391 and 1400. The founder of Petrov was Petr of Křavaře, after whom it is named.

Spa
The spa in Petrov was first mentioned on a map from 1569. The alkali-sulphurous ferruginous water from local springs was valued in the treatment of joint pain and skin diseases and later in musculoskeletal diseases. The spa was in operation until 1987. Today there is only one spring left.

Economy
Petrov is known for viticulture. The municipality lies in the Slovácká wine sub-region.

Sights
In the municipality there is a complex of búdy (above-ground wine cellars and presses) called Plže. The complex  consists of 80 of these folk buildings built since the 15th century. The area is protected by law as a village monument reservation.

References

External links

Villages in Hodonín District
Moravian Slovakia